Two ships of the Royal Navy have borne the name HMS Braak, the Dutch word for "break-through" (braak) or beagle (brak):

  was an 18-gun brig-sloop seized from the Dutch in 1795 and lost when she capsized in 1798.
 HMS Braak was a 24-gun sixth rate, formerly the Dutch Minerva. She was captured in 1799 and sold at Deptford in 1802. She then became the whaler African, making two voyages for Daniel Bennett.

Citations

Royal Navy ship names